Chen Jian (born 1 May 1962) is a Chinese engineer and an academician of the Chinese Academy of Engineering, formerly served as president of Jiangnan University from 2005 to 2020.

Biography 
Chen was born in Wuxi County, Jiangsu, on 1 May 1962. In 1979, he attended Tsinghua University, graduating in 1984 with a bachelor's degree in environmental engineering. He went on to receive his master's degree in 1986 and doctor's degree in 1990 at Wuxi Institute of Light Industry (now Jiangnan University) both in fermentation engineering. Since March 1990, he pursued advanced studies at Osaka University and Tokyo Institute of Technology in Japan and Inha University in South Korea.

He joined the faculty of Wuxi Institute of Light Industry in 1993, what he was promoted to deputy dean of the College of Bioengineering in 1995 and to vice president in 2001. In July 2005, he rose to become president of the university, and he held this post until 2020. He was honored as a Distinguished Young Scholar by the National Science Fund for Distinguished Young Scholars in 2006.

Honours and awards 
 2013 Science and Technology Innovation Award of the Ho Leung Ho Lee Foundation
 27 November 2017 Member of the Chinese Academy of Engineering (CAE)

References 

1962 births
Living people
People from Wuxi
Engineers from Jiangsu
Tsinghua University alumni
Jiangnan University alumni
Academic staff of Jiangnan University
Presidents of Jiangnan University
Members of the Chinese Academy of Engineering